Alain Rémi Bakou was a Congolese politician. An erstwhile member of the UDDIA party, he served as general rapporteur after the 1991 National Conference. Bakou was Mayor of Brazzaville between 1993 and 1994.

See also
 List of mayors of Brazzaville
 Timeline of Brazzaville

References

Possibly living people
Year of birth missing (living people)
Mayors of Brazzaville
People from Brazzaville